Saint-Tite station is a Via Rail station in Saint-Tite, Quebec, Canada. It is located on Machildon Street. The station is a shelter with no staff and serves as an optional stop for two Via Rail routes running from Montreal.

External links

Via Rail stations in Quebec
Railway stations in Mauricie